Mideast Dig, formerly known as The Mideast Reporter, is a non-for-profit news site and investigative journalism project founded by Richard Behar and Gary Weiss to deepen news coverage of the Middle East.  The project describes itself as, "completely nonpolitical, and not affiliated with any advocacy group."  The two journalists announced their intention of creating The Mideast Reporter in a March 2015 article in The New York Observer.

Writing in The Jerusalem Post, historian Gil Troy described Mideast Reporter as, "the Mideast Politico."   Behar himself describes his goal as providing, "first-class investigative reporting, with a relentless focus on the Middle East."  

As of 2015, the donation-funded online news site features Long-form journalism and plans to expand coverage as funding permits.

Weiss left the venture in November 2015 and the site's name was changed to Mideast Dig.

References

External links

Investigative journalism
International journalism organizations